San Te or San-De (Chinese: 三德) monk was a Shaolin martial arts disciple who trained under monk Zhi Shan. The title San-De means "Three Harmonies" or "Three Virtues". He lived in the early 18th century and resided at the Xichan Monastery after leaving the main Shaolin Monastery.

San Te has been depicted in some Hong Kong films. One of these were 1978's 36th Chamber of Shaolin ( "Master Killer" and "Shaolin Master Killer") starring Gordon Liu (a.k.a. Liu Chia-Hui and Lau Ka-Fai), along with 1980's Return to the 36th Chamber and 1985's Disciples of the 36th Chamber, produced by the Shaw Brothers Studio.

References

External links 
More information

Chinese martial artists
Fictional Buddhist monks
Shaolin Temple